Moondog was an American composer and musician, born as Louis T. Hardin.

Moondog may also refer to:

Music 
 Moondog, nickname of disc jockey Alan Freed
 Moondog Coronation Ball, a 1952 concert by Alan Freed
 The Moondogs, a 1970s punk rock band from Northern Ireland
 Moondog (band), a late-1980s hardcore band featuring members of Gorilla Biscuits
 Moondog Jr., a Belgian musical band later known as Zita Swoon
 Moondog (1956 album), an album by Moondog
 Moondog (1969 album), an album by Moondog

Other 
 Moondog Rex (1950–2019), an American professional wrestler
 Moondog (comics), a comic by George Metzger
 Moondog, a character in Monty (comic strip)
 Moondog (sculpture), created by Tony Smith
 Moon dog, a bright spot on a lunar halo
 Moondog, mascot of the Cleveland Cavaliers NBA basketball team
 The Moondogs, a professional wrestling stable
 Moondog Mayne, a common ring name of professional wrestler Ronald Doyle Mayne
 Moon Dogs, science fiction short stories by Michael Swanwick.
 Moondog, the main character in the Harmony Korine movie The Beach Bum
 Moondog Brewery, craft brewery based in Melbourne Australia

See also
 Johnny and the Moondogs, an early name of The Beatles
 Moondoggie